Seek for Surname History is a TV series broadcast by ATV in Hong Kong in 2011.  Each episode is dedicated to telling some of the legendary stories that belong to the Chinese surnames in the Hundred Family Surnames ancient text.

Production
The first season features 26 episodes hosted by Spencer Leung.  The content is not limited to just the five big surnames, but also covers lesser known names.

Many of the stories are legacy stories researched from ancient family trees that go back hundreds to thousands of years. Some of the stories focus on how the surname ended up in Hong Kong.

Episode surnames

External links
Official site

References

Asia Television original programming
2011 Hong Kong television series debuts